Khabarovsky (masculine), Khabarovskaya (feminine), or Khabarovskoye (neuter) may refer to:
Khabarovsk Krai (Khabarovsky Krai), a federal subject of Russia
Khabarovsky District, a district of Khabarovsk Krai, Russia
Khabarovsky (rural locality), a rural locality (a settlement) in Novosibirsk Oblast, Russia
Khabarovskaya, a rural locality (a village) in Irkutsk Oblast, Russia

See also
Khabarovsk (disambiguation)
Khabarsky (disambiguation)